Seven Fairies may refer to:

Seven Fairies in Charles Perrault's version of the European tale Sleeping Beauty
Pleiades (Greek mythology), seven daughters of the titan Atlas and the sea-nymph Pleione
Seven Fairies (China), seven celestial sisters from Chinese mythology; see Yaoji
Helloi Taret, from Meitei mythology (Manipuri mythology) in Northeast India
Seven Fairies of Saptha Kannimar Padal in South Indian culture
Seven Fairies from the Javanese folktale Jaka Tarub and Seven Fairies; see Tian Xian Pei